The Nokia N93 is a smartphone from Nokia, part of the multimedia Nseries. It was introduced on 25 April 2006 and released in July 2006. It runs on Symbian OS v9.1 and the S60 3rd Edition interface. It was the most advanced camera phone from Nokia at the time of its release, and was particularly marketed for its camcorder, packed in its unique swivel design like its predecessor Nokia N90.

The N93 improved upon camera capabilities over the N90. The phone has a 3.2-megapixel camera, Carl Zeiss optics and 3x optical zoom (the first Nokia phone to have it) as well as a 30 fps 640×480 (VGA) MPEG-4 video recording capability.

It was succeeded by the Nokia N93i.

Features

DVD-like video capture at 30 frames per second in the MPEG-4 format at VGA resolution
3.2-megapixel camera with Carl Zeiss Vario Tessar optics and flash
320×240 pixels; 262,144 colors 2.4" display
3x optical zoom / 20x digital zoom
direct TV out connectivity
easy video creation and burning to DVD with Adobe Premiere Elements 2.0
digital image stabilization
close up mode
Visual Radio
50 MB memory, 64 MB RAM, up to 2 GB mini SD card storage (90 minutes of "DVD-like" video)
 Dual ARM 11 332 MHz CPU
Infrared and Bluetooth
Wi-Fi (802.11b and g), 3G (WCDMA 2100 MHz), EDGE and GSM (900/1800/1900 MHz) networks
Java MIDP 2.0
Adobe Flash Lite 1.1 preinstalled (supports Flash Lite 2.1 and Flash Lite 3.0 developer editions)
Symbian application support
UPnP (Universal Plug and Play) support
 Comes standard with a full
 Fully hardware accelerated PowerVR 3D graphics from Imagination Technologies (including OpenGL ES 1.1 and M3G, see JBenchmark)
Push to Talk over Cellular (PoC)

Versions
As well as coming in 2 colors, pearl black and silver, there was also a Nokia N93 Golf Edition which had been preloaded with Pro Session Golf software to help improve golf skills. There was also a Mission: Impossible III edition which included a memory card preloaded with the movie and a Mission: Impossible III theme.

N-Gage
Although Nokia planned to release an N-Gage application for N93 (alongside N73 and N93i), it never made it due to memory issues.

In popular culture
The Nokia N93's likeness is used in the video game Tony Hawk's Project 8 as the way for players to view their in-game messages and videos.

Reviews
 All About Symbian N93 Review (part 1) – Covers multimedia aspects of the phone
 All About Symbian N93 Review (part 2) – Covers smartphone aspects, and summary
 All About Symbian N90 vs N93
 Mobile-review N93 review
 N93 reviews and specifications round up

References

External links

Online copy of the N93 Manual (PDF) 
Nokia Nseries Social Media – N93 resource 
More on the graphics technology inside the N 93 and N95 
N93 technical specifications 
N93 general information 

N-Gage (service) compatible devices
Universal Plug and Play devices
Nokia Nseries
Mobile phones with infrared transmitter
Mobile phones introduced in 2006